Reflectopallium papillatum, is a species of air-breathing land slug, specifically a leaf-veined slug, a terrestrial pulmonate gastropod mollusc in the family Athoracophoridae.

Distribution
This species is endemic to Mount Algidus in the South Island of New Zealand.

References

 Powell A. W. B., New Zealand Mollusca, William Collins Publishers Ltd, Auckland, New Zealand 1979 
 NZETC

Athoracophoridae
Gastropods of New Zealand
Gastropods described in 1963